Serge Cantin (born 7 August 1945) is a Canadian bobsledder. He competed in the two man and the four man events at the 1980 Winter Olympics.

References

1945 births
Living people
Canadian male bobsledders
Olympic bobsledders of Canada
Bobsledders at the 1980 Winter Olympics
Sportspeople from Montreal